Benjamín Castillo Valdez (born 30 March 1959) is a Mexican politician affiliated with the PRI. He currently serves as Deputy of the LXII Legislature of the Mexican Congress representing Baja California.

References

1959 births
Living people
People from Mexicali
Institutional Revolutionary Party politicians
21st-century Mexican politicians
Politicians from Baja California
Autonomous University of Baja California alumni
Deputies of the LXII Legislature of Mexico
Members of the Chamber of Deputies (Mexico) for Baja California